This is a list of islands of Croatia. The number and classification of islands in Croatia varies over time and by different measurements, causing some domestic controversy when discrepancies are found.

Largest islands
These are the larger ones, sorted approximately from northwest to southeast:

Northern seacoast
 the Brijuni islands, also a national park
 Krk, the largest along with Cres
 Plavnik
 Cres, the largest along with Krk
 Lošinj
 Ilovik
 Unije
 Susak
 Prvić
 Goli Otok
 Sveti Grgur
 Rab
 Pag
 Olib
 Silba
 Premuda
 Ist
 Molat

Northern Dalmatia
 Vir
 Dugi Otok
 Ugljan
 Iž
 Pašman
 the Kornati archipelago, also a national park
 Krapanj
 Murter
 Sestrunj
 Škarda
 Zlarin

Central and southern Dalmatia
 Čiovo
 Drvenik
 Šolta
 Brač 
 Hvar 
 Vis 
 Biševo
 Brusnik
 Jabuka, closest to Italy
 Svetac
 Korčula, the most populated one
 Lastovo
 Mljet, includes a national park
 the Elaphiti Islands: Koločep, Lopud, Šipan
 Lokrum 
 Palagruža, southernmost one
 Žirje
 Žut

Hydrographic Institute definitions
The Hydrographic Institute of the Republic of Croatia classifies all landforms surrounded by water in the Adriatic Sea as islands, islets (otočići) and rocks (hridi). The categorization is determined according to their surface area.

List of islands
The area data is rounded off to the second decimal.

Selected islets
The following is an incomplete list of islets.

Badija
Brijuni
Farfarikulac, island in the Telašćica Nature Park
Galešnjak 
Galijula, southernmost Croatian island.
Jabuka
Jaz
Knežak
Košljun
Kozjak
Krapanj
Lokrum
Lunga (Kornat)
Lupac
Male Srakane
Olipa
 Ošljak
Palagruža
Pokonji Dol, easternmost island of the Pakleni otoci archipelago
Radelj
Ruda
Sveti Andrija (Dubrovnik), uninhabited island near Dubrovnik
Sveti Andrija (Rovinj), also known as Crveni otok (English: Red Island), off the coast of Rovinj

Bureau of Statistics definitions
The Croatian Bureau of Statistics uses data from the Geographical Department of the Faculty of Science of the University of Zagreb, which classifies a total of 1,185 islands, rocks and reefs: 48 inhabited islands, 670 uninhabited islands, 389 rocks and 78 reefs. The rocks and reefs are defined as the "rocky remains of an islet or a rocky formation destroyed by abrasion", differentiated by whether they are "always above sea level" or "at, under or above sea level (at low tide)", respectively.

Other definitions
Mark Biondich's Eastern Europe: An Introduction to the People, Lands, and Culture puts the number of Croatian islands at 1,246. Of these, there are 718 islands in the conventional sense, 389 cliffs, and 78 reefs.

See also
 List of islands in the Adriatic
 List of inhabited islands of Croatia

References

External links
 

Islands
 
Lists of islands by country